Badi' al-Zaman ("The Wonder of the Age") or Bediüzzaman may refer to:

Badi' al-Zaman al-Hamadani (10th century), master of Arabic prose
Badi' al-Zaman Mirza (died 1514), Timurid ruler of Herat
Said Nursî (1877–1960), Turkish Muslim scholar

Arabic honorifics